Rasta Got Soul is reggae, dancehall artist Buju Banton's ninth studio album. It was released on April 21, 2009. The album features the hit single "Magic City". The album received a Grammy nomination in the Best Reggae Album category.

Track listing
"Hurt Us No More" - 5:28
"Magic City"  - 5:13
"I Rise" - 5:10
"Rastafari" - 6:03
"I Wonder"  - 4:44
"A Little Bit of Sorry" - 4:01
"Affairs Of The Heart" -  4:15
"Lend a Hand" - 4:54
"Optimistic Soul" - 4:15
"Make You Mine" - 5:11
"Mary" - 4:09
"Bedtime Story" (featuring Wyclef Jean) - 4:09
"Sense of Purpose" (featuring Third World) - 4:07
"Be on Your Way" - 3:33
"Lights Out" - 4:57
"Mirror" (Bonus Track) - 4:10

Double LP - Track listing
Side A:
"Hurt Us No More" - 5:28
"Magic City"  - 5:13
"I Rise" - 5:10
Side B:
"Rastafari" - 6:03
"I Wonder"  - 4:44
"A Little Bit of Sorry" - 4:01
Side C:
"Affairs Of The Heart" -  4:15
"Lend a Hand" - 4:54
"Optimistic Soul" - 4:15
"Mary" - 4:09
Side D:
"Make You Mine" - 5:11
"Bedtime Story" (featuring Wyclef Jean) - 4:09
"Sense of Purpose" (featuring Third World) - 4:07
"Be on Your Way" - 3:33

References

Buju Banton albums
2009 albums